Yahşiler can refer to:

 Yahşiler, Kemah
 Yahşiler, Tavas
 Yahşiler, Yumurtalık
 Yahşiler, Erzincan